The A21 autoroute is a toll free highway in north western France it is also known as the Rocade Minière.

Junctions

Completed

In construction
Upgrade of N455 between Flers-en-Escrebieux and Pecquencourt which is the northern by-pass Douai.

Proposed
Upgrade of the N455 between Pecquencourt and Douchy-les-Mines and the A2.

External links

 A21 Motorway on Saratlas

A21
Nord (French department)
Transport in Pas-de-Calais